Three ships of the United States Navy have been named USS West Virginia in honor of the 35th state.

United States Navy ship names